Sekai (Japanese for "world") may refer to:
Sekai (magazine), a Japanese political magazine
"Sekai" (song), a 2006 song by Japanese singer-songwriter Chara
"Sekai" (Musician), Tiago Salvador, a Portuguese musician

People with the given name Sekai include:
Koh Se-kai (born 1934), Taiwanese historian
Sekai Holland (born 1942), Zimbabwean politician
Sekai Nzenza-Shand (born 1959), Zimbabwean writer
Sekai (dancer), (born 1991), Japanese dancer.

See also
 Sakai (disambiguation)